Amarna Letter EA6 is a correspondence from Burra-Buriyaš to  Nimmuwarea(Amenhotep III) the king of Egypt. 

According to one source, this letter concerns gifts between two kings.

The letter is part of a series of correspondences from Babylonia to Egypt, which run from EA2 to EA4 and EA6 to EA14. EA1 and EA5 are from Egypt to Babylonia.  
The inscription is translated as follows:

See also
Amarna letters: EA 1, EA 2, EA 3, EA 4, EA 5, EA 7, EA 8, EA 9, EA 10, EA 11
Bi (cuneiform)
De Beneficiis

References

Amarna letters